Ihsan Kamal (born Girga, Egypt 1935) is an Egyptian writer. She has adapted a number of her short stories for television and film, and her work has been translated into English, Russian, Chinese, Dutch and Swedish.

Kamal is a founding member of the Egyptian Writers' Union. In addition to her literary works, Kamal received a degree in embroidery arts in 1956.

Awards and honours
 The Short Story Club Prize, 1958 and 1960
 The Ihsan 'Abd al-Quddus Prize for Short Stories, 1991
 The Mahmud Taymur Prize for short stories, 1994
 a medal from the Supreme Council for Arts and Humanities in 1974

Selected works 
 ijn ai-maiika ("The Queen's Prison") short stories (1960)
 Satr maghiut ("A Mistake in the Knitting") short stories (1971)
 Ahlam ai-'umr kullih (An Entire Life's Dreams") short stories (1976)
 ailHubb abadan ia yamut ("Love Never Dies") short stories (1981)
 Aqwa min ai-hubb ("Stronger Than Love") short stories (1982)
 Lahn min ai-sama''' ("A Melody from the Heavens") short stories (1987)
 Mamnu' dukhui ai-zawjat ("wives are not admitted") short stories (1988)
 Dayfat ai-fajr ("A Dawn Guest") short stories (1992)
 Basmat shifah ("Lip Print") novel (1999)
 Qabi ai-hubb ahyanan'' ("Before Love Sometimes") short stories (1998)

References 

1935 births
Living people
Egyptian women short story writers
Egyptian short story writers